So Human an Animal: How We Are Shaped by Surroundings and Events, is a book written by René Dubos and published by Scribner in 1968.  It won the 1969 Pulitzer Prize for General Non-Fiction.

Themes 
In the book, Dubos, a microbiologist and pathologist, explores the thesis that technology is dehumanizing us and that science needs to be humanized. In his 1976 book The Existential Pleasures of Engineering, American engineer and writer Samuel C. Florman identifies this book as "an important feature of the antitechnology crusade".

References

External links

1968 non-fiction books
Pulitzer Prize for General Non-Fiction-winning works